is a university hospital located in Suita, Osaka, Japan, affiliated with Osaka University.

Medical Departments
This hospital has following medical departments:

 Department of Medicine
 Cardiovascular Medicine
 Nephrology
 Gastroenterology and Hepatology
 Metabolic Medicine
 Respiratory Medicine
 Clinical Immunology
 Hematology and Oncology
 Geriatrics and Hypertension
 Kampo Medicine
 General Medicine

 Department of Surgery
 Cardiovascular
 General Thoracic
 Gastroenterological
 Breast and Endocrine
 Pediatric
 Department of Diagnostic Pathology

 Deparment of Sensory, Cutaneous and Motor Organ Medicine
 Ophthalmology
 Otorhinolaryngology-Head and Neck Surgery
 Orthopaedic Surgery
 Dermatology
 Plastic Surgery
 Rehabilitation Medicine

 Department of Clinical Neuroscience
 Neurology and Cerebrovascular Diseases
 Neuropsychiatry
 Neurosurgery
 Anesthesiology

 Department of Woman, Child Health and Urology
 Obstetrics & Gynecology
 Pediatrics
 Urology

 Department of Radiology
 Diagnostic and Interventional Radiology
 Radiotherapy
 Nuclear Medicine

Access
 Handai-byōin-mae Station

See also
 Osaka University

External links
 大阪大学医学部附属病院
 Osaka University Hospital

References 

Hospital
Suita
Hospitals in Osaka Prefecture
Hospitals established in 1869
Hospital buildings completed in 1993
Teaching hospitals in Japan
1869 establishments in Japan